The Canadian Opera Company (COC) is an opera company in Toronto, Ontario, Canada. It is the largest opera company in Canada and one of the largest producers of opera in North America. The COC performs in its own opera house, the Four Seasons Centre for the Performing Arts. For forty years until April 2006, the COC had performed at the O'Keefe Centre (now known as Meridian Hall).

History

Nicholas Goldschmidt and Herman Geiger-Torel founded the organization in 1950 as the Royal Conservatory Opera Company. Geiger-Torel became the COC's artistic director in 1956 and its general director in 1960. The company was renamed the Canadian Opera Association in 1960, and the Canadian Opera Company in 1977. Geiger-Torel retired from the general directorship in 1976. Lotfi Mansouri was the COC's general director from 1976 to 1988. In 1983, the COC introduced surtitles (supertitles) to their productions, the first company to use them in an opera house. Productions included Joan Sutherland's first performance of Donizetti's Anna Bolena.

Brian Dickie served as the COC's general director from 1988 to 1993. Dickie named Richard Bradshaw the COC's chief conductor and head of music in 1989. Elaine Calder was the COC's general director from 1994 to 1997. In 1998, Bradshaw was named general director. During his tenure, Bradshaw secured funding for the COC's new permanent home, the Four Seasons Centre for the Performing Arts. Previously, the COC had been performing at the O'Keefe Centre (renamed to the Hummingbird Centre and then the Sony Centre for the Performing Arts).

In 2006, the COC opened its new opera house with an all-new production of Wagner's Der Ring des Nibelungen. Michael Levine was the designer, and there were four directors: Michael Levine (Das Rheingold), Atom Egoyan (Die Walküre), François Girard (Siegfried), and Tim Albery (Götterdämmerung).

In 2006, Bradshaw's contract as general director was renewed for another 10 years. Bradshaw died of a sudden heart attack on August 15, 2007. In June 2008, Alexander Neef was named the COC's general director; he formally assumed the position in October 2008. In October 2008, Johannes Debus made his debut with the COC as a conductor in a production of Prokofiev's War and Peace, where he earned critical acclaim. In January 2009, the COC announced Debus's appointment as music director. Sandra Horst, who runs the University of Toronto's Opera Division, has long served as the company's chorus master.

The 2019/2020 COC theatre season was cut short due to the global COVID-19 pandemic, on which the COC ceased all productions after March 2020 due to restrictions on large indoor gatherings.  The COC hoped to restart the shortened 2020/2021 theatre season by January 2021, however on October 6, 2020, company management announced that the entire 2020/2021 COC theatre season was cancelled due to the ongoing pandemic.

Neef became director general of the Paris Opera in September 2020 and was replaced by Briton Perryn Leech in March 2021.

Recent productions

2008/2009 season
 Mozart: Don Giovanni
 Prokofiev: War and Peace
 Beethoven: Fidelio
 Dvořák: Rusalka
 Verdi: Simon Boccanegra
 Puccini: La bohème
 Britten: A Midsummer Night's Dream

2009/2010 season
Madama Butterfly by Giacomo Puccini
The Nightingale and Other Short Fables by Igor Stravinsky
Carmen by Georges Bizet
Otello by Giuseppe Verdi
The Flying Dutchman (opera) by Richard Wagner
Maria Stuarda by Gaetano Donizetti
Idomeneo by Wolfgang Amadeus Mozart

2010/2011 season
Aida by Giuseppe Verdi
Death in Venice (opera) by Benjamin Britten
The Magic Flute by Wolfgang Amadeus Mozart
Nixon in China by John Adams (composer)
La Cenerentola by Gioachino Rossini
Ariadne auf Naxos by Richard Strauss
Orfeo ed Euridice by Christoph Willibald Gluck

2011/2012 season
Iphigénie en Tauride by Christoph Willibald Gluck
Rigoletto by Giuseppe Verdi
Tosca by Giacomo Puccini
L'Amour de loin by Kaija Saariaho
The Tales of Hoffmann by Jacques Offenbach
Eine florentinische Tragödie by Alexander von Zemlinsky
Gianni Schicchi by Giacomo Puccini
Semele (Handel) by George Frideric Handel

2012/2013 season
Il trovatore by Giuseppe Verdi
Die Fledermaus by Johann Strauss II
Tristan und Isolde by Richard Wagner
La clemenza di Tito by Wolfgang Amadeus Mozart
Salome (opera) by Richard Strauss
Dialogues des Carmélites by Francis Poulenc
Lucia di Lammermoor by Gaetano Donizetti

2013/2014 season
La bohème by Giacomo Puccini
Peter Grimes by Benjamin Britten
Così fan tutte by Wolfgang Amadeus Mozart
Un ballo in maschera by Giuseppe Verdi
Hercules (Handel) by George Frideric Handel
Roberto Devereux by Gaetano Donizetti
Don Quichotte by Jules Massenet

2014/2015 season
Falstaff (opera) by Giuseppe Verdi
Madama Butterfly by Giacomo Puccini
Don Giovanni by Wolfgang Amadeus Mozart
Die Walküre by Richard Wagner
The Barber of Seville by Gioachino Rossini
Bluebeard's Castle by Béla Bartók
Erwartung by Arnold Schoenberg

2015/2016 season
La traviata by Giuseppe Verdi
Pyramus and Thisbe by Barbara Monk Feldman
Siegfried (opera) by Richard Wagner
The Marriage of Figaro by Wolfgang Amadeus Mozart
Carmen by Georges Bizet
Maometto II by Gioachino Rossini

2016/2017 season
Norma (opera) by Vincenzo Bellini
Ariodante by George Frideric Handel
The Magic Flute by Wolfgang Amadeus Mozart
Götterdämmerung by Richard Wagner
Louis Riel (opera) by Harry Somers
Tosca by Giacomo Puccini

2017/2018 season
The Elixir of Love by Gaetano Donizetti
Arabella by Richard Strauss
Rigoletto by Giuseppe Verdi
Abduction from the Seraglio by Wolfgang Amadeus Mozart
The Nightingale and Other Short Fables by Igor Stravinsky
Anna Bolena by Gaetano Donizetti

2018/2019 season
Eugene Onegin by Pyotr Ilyich Tchaikovsky
Hadrian by Rufus Wainwright
Elektra by Richard Strauss
Così fan tutte by Wolfgang Amadeus Mozart
La Bohème by Giacomo Puccini
Otello by Giuseppe Verdi

2019/2020 season 

 Turandot by Giacomo Puccini
 Rusalka by Antonín Dvořák
 The Barber of Seville by Gioachino Rossini
 Hansel and Gretel by Engelbert Humperdinck
 Aida by Giuseppe Verdi (cancelled)
 The Flying Dutchman by Richard Wagner (postponed to 2022/2023 season)

2020/2021 season (cancelled) 

Due to the global COVID-19 pandemic, the Canadian Opera Company cancelled all live in-person performances for the 2020/2021 season.

2021/2022 season 

Due to the global COVID-19 pandemic, the COC cancelled several planned performances for the 2021/2022 season, but managed to stage two in-person productions in the spring of 2022.

 La traviata by Giuseppe Verdi
 The Magic Flute by Wolfgang Amadeus Mozart

2022/2023 season 

 The Flying Dutchman by Richard Wagner
 Carmen by Georges Bizet
 The Marriage of Figaro by Wolfgang Amadeus Mozart
 Salome by Richard Strauss
 Macbeth by Giuseppe Verdi
 Tosca by Giacomo Puccini

2023/2024 season 

 Fidelio by Ludwig van Beethoven
 La bohème by Giacomo Puccini
 The Cunning Little Vixen by Leoš Janáček
 Don Giovanni by Wolfgang Amadeus Mozart
 Don Pasquale by Gaetano Donizetti
 Medea by Luigi Cherubini
 Aportia Chryptych: A Black Opera for Portia White by HAUI x Sean Mayes

Notable members
Cornelis Opthof - longest serving member for fifty years.

References

External links
 Canadian Opera Company website

Social Media
 Twitter
 Facebook

Musical groups established in 1950
Canadian opera companies
Musical groups from Toronto
1950 establishments in Ontario